The Ohiopyle High Bridge is a structure that carries the Great Allegheny Passage trail across the Youghiogheny River in Ohiopyle, Pennsylvania.

The span was originally opened in 1912 as part of the last major railroad constructed in Pennsylvania. It served the Western Maryland Railway's expansion from Cumberland, Maryland to Connellsville, Pennsylvania and was one of two bridges to cross a meandering section of the Yough in Ohiopyle.  The High Bridge rises over 100 feet higher than its sister span, which sits upstream from the area's famous waterfall.

By the 1960s, the importance of the High Bridge was dramatically reduced.  In 1975, the Western Maryland eliminated all service west of Hancock, Maryland.  Following the closure of the line, the bridge sat unused until its repurposing as a pedestrian and bicycle crossing in 1999.

External links
Bridge Mapper
Bridge Photos

Bridges in Fayette County, Pennsylvania
Bridges completed in 1912
1912 establishments in Pennsylvania
Bridges over the Youghiogheny River
Girder bridges in the United States
Pedestrian bridges in Pennsylvania